Shaila Sabt  (born August 19, 1988, Muharraq, Bahrain) is a Bahraini actress, model and beauty pageant titleholder of Indian descent who was crowned Bahrain Top Model 2010.

Biography
Sabt graduated from New York Institute of Technology with a major in human resource management. She is from a performing family, including her actress mother Fatima Ismail and actress sisters Shaima, Shatha, and Abrar. Her first role was as a bit part as a child alongside Shaima in the Saudi series Ailat Abu Ruwaished in 1998, but she did not return to acting until much later. After winning Miss Bahrain in 2010, she returned to acting the following year and appeared in many television and theatrical works.

Career

Television series

Theatre

Film

Video Clip
In 2021, she appeared in a video clip with the Yemini musician Fuad Abdulwahad titled "Ghann" (lit. Sing).

External links
 El Cinema page
 MBC Interview Page
 Interviews in Sayidaty magazine
 Yasmina magazine articles

References

1989 births
Living people
Bahraini television actresses
Bahraini beauty pageant contestants
Bahraini female models
21st-century actresses